The splenic plexus (lienal plexus in older texts) is formed by branches from the celiac plexus, the left celiac ganglion, and from the right vagus nerve.

It accompanies the lienal artery to the spleen, giving off, in its course, subsidiary plexuses along the various branches of the artery.

References

External links

Nerve plexus
Nerves of the torso